The 1975 Rhineland-Palatinate state election was conducted on 9 March 1975 to elect members to the Landtag, the state legislature of Rhineland-Palatinate, West Germany.

|-
|colspan=15| 
|-
! style="background-color:#E9E9E9;text-align:left;" width=300px colspan=2|Party
! style="background-color:#E9E9E9;text-align:right;" width=50px |Vote %
! style="background-color:#E9E9E9;text-align:right;" width=50px |Vote % ±
! style="background-color:#E9E9E9;text-align:right;" width=50px |Seats
! style="background-color:#E9E9E9;text-align:right;" width=50px |Seats ±
|-
| width=5px style="background-color: " |
| style="text-align:left;" | Christian Democratic Union
| style="text-align:right;" | 53.9
| style="text-align:right;" | +3.9
| style="text-align:right;" | 55
| style="text-align:right;" | +2
|-
| style="background-color: " |
| style="text-align:left;" | Social Democratic Party
| style="text-align:right;" | 38.5
| style="text-align:right;" | –2.0
| style="text-align:right;" | 40
| style="text-align:right;" | –4
|-
| style="background-color: " |
| style="text-align:left;" | Free Democratic Party
| style="text-align:right;" | 5.6
| style="text-align:right;" | –0.3
| style="text-align:right;" | 5
| style="text-align:right;" | +2
|-
| style="background-color: " |
| style="text-align:left;" | National Democratic Party
| style="text-align:right;" | 1.1
| style="text-align:right;" | –1.6
| style="text-align:right;" | 0
| style="text-align:right;" | ±0
|-
| style="background-color: " |
| style="text-align:left;" | German Communist Party
| style="text-align:right;" | 0.5
| style="text-align:right;" | –0.4
| style="text-align:right;" | 0
| style="text-align:right;" | ±0
|- 
| style="background-color: " |
| style="text-align:left;" | Others
| style="text-align:right;" | 0.3
| style="text-align:right;" | N/A
| style="text-align:right;" | 0
| style="text-align:right;" | N/A
|- style="background: #E9E9E9"
! style="text-align:left;" colspan=2| Total
| 100.0
| —
| 100
| ±0
|-
| colspan=9 style="text-align:left;" | Source: parties-and-elections.de
|}

1975
1975 elections in Germany
1975 in West Germany